Regular Show (known as Regular Show in Space during its eighth season) is an American animated sitcom created by J. G. Quintel for Cartoon Network. It ran from September 6, 2010, to January 16, 2017, over the course of eight seasons and 261 episodes. The series follows the lives of two 23-year old friends, Mordecai (a bluejay) and Rigby (a raccoon). They work at a local park as groundskeepers. Their coworkers are Skips (a yeti), Muscle Man and Hi-Five Ghost. Other characters include Pops (a lollipop-shaped man and the park's manager) and the duo's boss Benson (a gumball machine). The duo spend their days slacking off and trying to avoid work to entertain themselves by any means which leads to surrealistic, extreme and supernatural misconduct.<ref name="wired">{{cite magazine|date=April 3, 2012|title=Regular Shows J.G. Quintel Is Just a Regular Guy|url=https://www.wired.com/geekdad/2012/04/j-gquintel/|magazine=Wired|archive-url=https://web.archive.org/web/20170101173441/https://www.wired.com/2012/04/j-g-quintel/|archive-date=January 1, 2017|access-date=July 15, 2012}}</ref>

Many of Regular Show characters were loosely based on those developed for Quintel's student films at California Institute of the Arts: The Naïve Man from Lolliland and 2 in the AM PM. The former was one of the winners of the 2005 Nicktoons Film Festival and received international attention after being broadcast on Nicktoons Network. Quintel pitched Regular Show for Cartoon Network's Cartoonstitute project, in which the network allowed young artists to create pilots with no notes, which would possibly be optioned as shows. The series premiered on September 6, 2010, on Cartoon Network.

As of May 2013, the program had been watched by approximately 2 to 2.5 million viewers each week. The series has received acclaim from critics and has developed a following of all ages, although it has garnered controversy for its dark humor, sexual innuendos, violence and mature themes. Regular Show has been nominated for several awards, including seven Annie Awards, six Primetime Emmy Awards – one of which it won for the episode "Eggscellent" (season 3, episode 18) – and three British Academy Children's Awards. A film based on the series, titled Regular Show: The Movie, premiered in 2015.

After eight seasons and 261 episodes, the series concluded on January 16, 2017, with the 33-minute finale "A Regular Epic Final Battle".

Premise

The series revolves around the daily lives of two 23-year-old friends – Mordecai (a blue jay) and Rigby (a raccoon) – who work as groundskeepers at a park, and spend their days trying to avoid work and entertain themselves by any means. This is much to the chagrin of their boss Benson (a gumball machine), and their coworker Skips (a yeti), but to the delight of park manager Pops (a man with a lollipop-shaped head). Their other coworkers include an overweight green male named Muscle Man, and a ghost named Hi-Five Ghost,   who serve as their rivals.

Creation

Regular Show largely grew out of creator J. G. Quintel's life and experiences in college. Quintel attended the California Institute of the Arts, and many of the characters on Regular Show are based on the characters developed for his student films The Naïve Man from Lolliland (2005) and 2 in the AM PM (2006). Both originated as part of the 48-Hour Film Project, in which students put words into a hat, pulled out one word at midnight and spent a weekend developing ideas for a film. Quintel attended college with Thurop Van Orman and Pendleton Ward, who both went on to work at Cartoon Network Studios with Quintel; Van Orman created The Marvelous Misadventures of Flapjack and Ward created Adventure Time. Quintel concurrently worked on Camp Lazlo and as creative director on The Marvelous Misadventures of Flapjack while completing his degree. He was later invited to pitch for Cartoon Network's Cartoonstitute, a project to showcase short films created without the interference of network executives and focus testing.

Quintel returned to the characters from his films, put them together with newer characters and created a pilot. Quintel wanted to present a visual pitch rather than a verbal one, believing the idea would make little sense otherwise. He storyboarded the idea for the pilot, and Craig McCracken and Rob Renzetti liked his presentation. Regular Show was one of two series from the project that were green-lit – the other being Secret Mountain Fort Awesome, based on the Cartoonstitute short Uncle Grandpa, which in turn became its own series later on. The project was eventually scrapped and never premiered on television. The character of Mordecai embodies Quintel during his college years, specifically at CalArts; Quintel said, "That's that time when you're hanging out with your friends and getting into stupid situations, but you're also taking it seriously enough." The character of Rigby was randomly developed when Quintel drew a raccoon hula-hooping. He liked the design and developed the character of Rigby to be far less responsible than his companion.

Episodes are produced using storyboarding and hand-drawn animation, and each episode takes roughly nine months to create. Quintel recruited several independent comic book artists to draw the show's animated elements; their style matched closely with Quintel's ideas for the series. The show's soundtrack comprises original music composed by Mark Mothersbaugh as well as licensed songs. While preparing for the beginning of the show, Quintel looked for young, independent comic artists to comprise the show's storyboard artists; he thought that the style would closely match that of Regular Show. He looked through blogs and convention panels for the "total package", which he said was the ability to write and draw, something that many independent comic book artists possess. In addition, Quintel attended many open shows at CalArts, an eight-hour festival of student animation. The style and sensibility of Regular Show was difficult to work with in the beginning; the artists struggled to create a natural, sitcom-like sound for the series.

Inspirations
Growing up, Quintel was inspired by The Simpsons and Beavis and Butt-Head, and credits the stylistic elements of Joe Murray's Rocko's Modern Life and Camp Lazlo as working their way into his style. Video games Street Fighter, Shadowrun and ToeJam & Earl—which Quintel played when he was a child—also inspired the series, as did some British television programs. Quintel's interest in British television was influenced by his British roommate at CalArts, who introduced him to The League of Gentlemen, The IT Crowd, Little Britain, The Office and The Mighty Boosh; the latter was very influential to Quintel and would later influence the humor in Regular Show.

Production

Writing
The plots of Regular Show episodes generally begin with a basic problem that the characters must overcome. While the protagonists work on their task, a magical, supernatural or strange element appears and complicates the initially simple problem. The writers decided to follow this narrative structure to take advantage of the animation.

The series is rated TV-PG-V. Cartoon Network told Quintel early on that they wanted to "age it up from the TV-Y7 stuff we'd been doing in the past". This direction led the crew to use adult-oriented humor with innuendos and drug and alcohol references. One of the program's storyboard artists, Calvin Wong, said he enjoys the limitations set by writing for the show since the adult-oriented jokes that are approved are satisfying.

The plots of the episodes were influenced by Quintel's and the writers' personal experiences, such as performing prank telephone calls or accepting an eating challenge from a restaurant. The show often references 1980s culture, using music and electronic devices from that era because many factors from the decade left a positive influence on Quintel. The show also makes references to modern social trends such as viral internet videos.

Voice cast

The voice acting of the series is relatively low-key, and the intention was to make most of the characters sound natural and conversational. Quintel wanted to make the show listenable and given contrast to most other cartoons, which often are difficult for adults to listen to. The main cast consists of voice acting veterans Mark Hamill, who portrays Skips, and Roger Craig Smith, who plays Thomas. William Salyers plays the voice of Rigby; Janie Haddad portrays Margaret; Quintel's former CalArts classmate Sam Marin voices Benson, Pops and Muscle Man; and Quintel portrays Mordecai and Hi-Five Ghost. Members of the production staff have voiced several characters throughout the series, including Minty Lewis, Toby Jones, Andress Salaff and Matt Price. The Regular Show cast recorded their lines together in group as opposed to individual recording sessions for each actor; this helped make the show's dialogue sound natural. The series regularly used guest voice actors for recurring characters, such as Steven Blum, Courtenay Taylor, David Ogden Stiers, Robin Atkin Downes, Jeff Bennett, Jennifer Hale, David Kaye, Fred Tatasciore, Matthew Yang King and Julian Holloway.

Animation
Each episode of Regular Show took about nine months to complete. Quintel and his 35-member team developed each episode at Cartoon Network Studios in Burbank, California. The script was illustrated in rough hand-drawn images, known as storyboards. The storyboards were then animated and mixed with the corresponding dialogue to create the animatic, which was then sent to be approved by the network. The show's assets – backgrounds, character designs, props, etc. – were then assembled to be sent to Saerom Animation in South Korea, where the actual animation production of the episode was performed. When finished, the episode was sent to Sabre Media Studios back in California. Music and sound effects were created, and the final episode is mixed and completed. The process allowed the production team to work concurrently on dozens of episodes at different stages of production.

Although most modern animation had switched to hybrid methods such as the Cintiq, Regular Show was described as "far more low-fi" and was animated traditionally by hand using paper, which was then digitally composited and painted with digital ink and paint. Although Cintiqs were initially optioned to be used for the program, Quintel stated that he felt more comfortable working on paper, considering it to be more organic and more representative of each artist's individual style. Board artist Calvin Wong said, "the tools of the trade as being pencils, pens, white-out and occasionally lightboxes and electric erasers".

Music

Regular Show has no regular theme music; instead, at the beginning of each episode, a blurred sound (provided by Quintel) followed by a ticking clock is heard over the title cards. The main composer of the series is Mark Mothersbaugh, one of the founding members of the band Devo. As Quintel was developing the pilot, he considered asking Mothersbaugh to create the music for the show. The episode's animatic was sent to Mothersbaugh, along with a request for him to join the show's staff and crew.

Regular Show also made use of licensed songs—mostly from the 1980s—which began when Quintel and the staff writers started recording the animatics using copyrighted songs for the montage scenes. The network executives watched the animatic and asked the crew if they wanted to use some of the songs for the finished episodes. Quintel said that the songs are chosen for their suitability for the scene, whether they sound good and if their licensing is affordable. Quintel enjoyed using the songs in the episodes, saying he thought adult viewers may remember them and younger viewers might appreciate older music. Songs in the show include "You're the Best Around", "Mississippi Queen", "Don't You (Forget About Me)" and "A Holly Jolly Christmas". The show also used several non-'80s songs, such as "Pale Blue Eyes" by The Velvet Underground in Regular Show: The Movie and "Heroes" by David Bowie in the series finale. Another notable song used in the show is "Here Comes a Regular" by The Replacements, a band often considered as underground.

The show also produced original songs that were used in episodes, which were generally composed by Mothersbaugh and written by one of the staff's storyboard artists. "Summertime Loving, Loving in the Summer (Time)" was written by staff member Sean Szeles and appeared in the episode "This Is My Jam" (season 2, episode 13).

Episodes

Most episodes of Regular Show last 11 minutes; episodes are usually paired together to fill a half-hour program slot. 261 episodes in eight seasons have been completed and broadcast. The first season began on September 6, 2010, with the episode "The Power" and ended on November 22, 2010, with "Mordecai and the Rigbys". The second season began on November 29, 2010, with the episode "Ello Gov'nor" and ended on August 1, 2011, with "Karaoke Video". The third season premiered on September 19, 2011, with the episode "Stick Hockey" and concluded on September 3, 2012, with "Bad Kiss". The fourth season premiered on October 1, 2012, with the half-hour special "Exit 9B" and concluded on August 12, 2013, with "Steak Me Amadeus". The fifth season premiered on September 2, 2013, with the episodes "Laundry Woes" and "Silver Dude" and concluded on August 14, 2014, with "Real Date". The sixth season premiered on October 9, 2014, with the episode "Maxin' and Relaxin'" and ended on June 25, 2015, with "Dumped at the Altar". The seventh season premiered with the episode  "Dumptown U.S.A." on June 26, 2015, and ended with the half-hour "Rigby's Graduation Day Special" on June 30, 2016. The eighth and final season, titled Regular Show in Space, started on September 26, 2016, with the episode "One Space Day at a Time" and ended on January 16, 2017, with "A Regular Epic Final Battle".

Crossovers
Mordecai and Rigby had cameo appearances on the Uncle Grandpa episode "Pizza Eve," along with other Cartoon Network characters from currently running and ended cartoons. Mordecai, Rigby and Hi-Five Ghost make a small cameo in The Amazing World of Gumball episode "The Boredom," along with the titular characters from Uncle Grandpa and Clarence. Mordecai and Hi-Five Ghost appear in the OK K.O.!: Let's Be Heroes special "Crossover Nexus," and a character resembling Mordecai cameos in Adventure Time episode "Ketchup".

Reception

Ratings
Regular Show became an instant hit. Its first and second seasons, broadcast on Monday nights, ranked No. 1 in its time slot among all key boy demos across all of television, according to Nielsen Media Research. The pilot's premiere was watched by 2.097 million viewers. For the following episodes of the first season, viewership increased by over 10% from the time period of the previous year. For instance, the entry was viewed by 1.339 million children aged 2–11, a 65% increase from the previous year. It was also watched by 716,000 children aged 9–14, a 43% increase. The Season 2 premiere, "Ello Gov'nor," marked a decline from the Season 1 premiere's figures. It gained 2.067 million views, but it marked an increase from the Season 1 finale, which had 2.028 million viewers. The Season 3 premiere, "Stick Hockey," saw a bigger decline in viewers, recording 2 million views. As the series continued, though, its ratings grew for a short time; the Season 4 premiere, "Exit 9B", was watched by 3.047 million viewers—a significant increase from previous seasons. However, as the series went on, the ratings would decline, and by the last season, most episodes had under 1 million viewers.

Critical reception

Regular Show received critical acclaim. A reviewer from IGN, R.L. Shaffer, called the show zany, absurd, bizarre and hilarious. He praised the show's writing and said that it included "snappy dialogue, odd characters, and clever storieseach more irrelevant than the lastRegular Show never ceases to tickle the funny bone." He finished his review by calling the show "a pretty awesome piece of refreshing off-the-wall comedy" and wrote that it's "humorously animated, brazenly silly and almost always funny."

DVD Talk'''s Neil Lumbrad described the show as "offbeat sense of humor with a lot of randomness that makes its title both peculiar and hilarious" and compared it to the original Looney Tunes shorts and other cartoons—including The Powerpuff Girls, Dexter's Laboratory and Johnny Bravo—that Cartoon Network has produced. He wrote that the network has found "animated gold with Regular Show, which is too offbeat and unique to be called regular" and that it is a "comedic animated gem worthy of being discovered for years to come." Lumbrad ended his review by recommending the show and calling it "one truly awesome cartoon with a lot of good humor to enjoy."The A.V. Clubs critic, Alasdair Wilkins, said that compared to another of Cartoon Network's animated comedies, Adventure Time, he does not consider the series to be funny, and described it as "more pleasingly weird". He said that the episodes' plots can occasionally be too complex to explore completely in the show's 11 minutes and that the usual story setup can make some stories feel structurally the same as others. Wilkins said he considers the show at its best when it focuses on the jokes, the character moments and inventive ways to use animation. Kevin McFarland, also of The A.V. Club, said he considers the series a thrill to watch; he complimented the animation style, characters and use of motifs.

Awards and nominations

Related media

Comic books
In January 2013, Boom! Studios announced that it would develop a comic book series based on the show and that KC Green would be writing the script and Allison Strejlav would be in charge of the illustrations. The first issue was officially released on May 15, 2013. A series of original graphic novels began publication in 2014, as well. The first, titled Hydration, was written by Rachel Connor and illustrated by Tessa Stone. It was followed by Noir Means Noir, Buddy (2015), A Clash of Consoles (2016), Wrasslesplosion (2017), The Meatening (2018) and Comic Conned (2018).

Video games
On November 9, 2011, a game called "Nightmare-Athon" was released in App Store for iOS. On January 24, 2013, a game called "Ride 'Em Rigby" was released in iOS.

On April 8, 2013, J. G. Quintel announced on his Twitter page that an official Regular Show video game was in development at the time, titled Regular Show: Mordecai and Rigby in 8-Bit Land. It was developed by WayForward Technologies and published by D3 Publisher for Nintendo 3DS. The video game was released on October 29, 2013. Mordecai and Rigby became playable characters in a video game called Cartoon Network: Battle Crashers, which was released for the Nintendo 3DS, PlayStation 4 and Xbox One on November 8, 2016, and the Nintendo Switch on October 31, 2017.

Other merchandise
Jazwares has produced an assortment of two-, six-, seven- and 10-inch licensed action figures and plush toys for the series. "Collectable Figures" have also been released, along with other themed merchandise, such as "80's Bobbleheads," "Pullback Custom Cruisers" and "Wrestling Buddies". There have been many graphic T-shirts officially licensed through clothing retailers Hot Topic, We Love Fine and Threadless. Looney Labs also released a Regular Show-themed version of the card game Fluxx on July 25, 2014.

Film

At the Cartoon Network 2015/2016 upfront, it was announced they were making Regular Show: The Movie. After accidentally creating a "Timenado," slacker groundskeepers Mordecai and Rigby go back in time and battle an evil volleyball coach in order to save the universe – and their friendship.

It first screened at The Downtown Independent in Los Angeles on August 14, 2015. It was released to digital download on September 1, 2015, as well as on DVD by Warner Home Video on October 13, 2015, and had its television premiere in November 2015. The movie also screened at select Alamo Drafthouse Cinemas across the United States, and it had select showtimes at the SVA Theatre of New York and the Cinema Montrereal CANADA during October 2015.

Home media
Region 1

Region 4

Explanatory notes

See also
 Adventure Time The Amazing World of Gumball Camp Lazlo Close Enough The Marvelous Misadventures of Flapjack''

References

External links

 
 

 
2010 American television series debuts
2010s American animated television series
2010s American comedy-drama television series
2010s American comic science fiction television series
2010s American sitcoms
2010s American surreal comedy television series
2010s American workplace comedy television series
2017 American television series endings
American animated sitcoms
American children's animated adventure television series
American children's animated comedy television series
American children's animated drama television series
American children's animated comic science fiction television series
American children's animated science fantasy television series
American children's animated space adventure television series
Animated television series about birds
Boom! Studios titles
Cartoon Network original programming
Television series by Cartoon Network Studios
English-language television shows
Television series about raccoons
Television series set in outer space
Television series created by J. G. Quintel
Television shows adapted into comics
Television shows adapted into video games